Sarhala is a town in northwestern Ivory Coast. It is a sub-prefecture and commune of Mankono Department in Béré Region, Woroba District.
In 2014, the population of the sub-prefecture of Sarhala was 38,207.

Villages
The twenty two villages of the sub-prefecture of Sarhala and their population in 2014 are:

Notes

Sub-prefectures of Béré Region
Communes of Béré Region